Shellharbour (also known as Shellharbour Village) is a suburb located in the Illawarra region of New South Wales, Australia. It also gives its name to the local government area, City of Shellharbour, and its central business district, Shellharbour City Centre.

The suburb is centred on the small recreational harbour named Shell Harbour. It has two main beaches: Shellharbour Beach, which runs to Barrack Point and Shellharbour South Beach, which runs toward Bass Point.

Shellharbour hosts Harbourside Markets on the fourth Sunday of the month, in Little Park.

History and culture 
The area was inhabited by indigenous Australians for thousands of years. European habitation began from about 1817 onwards.
Shellharbour was originally known as Yerrowah and later as Peterborough.

Shellharbour's coastline is littered with 9 shipwrecks, and other historical sites like Bass Point which is home to various Aboriginal archaeological evidence. The shipwrecks date back to 1851, and are all protected under the State NSW Heritage Act 1977 & Commonwealth Historic Shipwrecks Act 1976.

Shipwrecks include:
 Alexander Berry – Wrecked at Bass Point on 1 July 1901.
 Amphitrite – Ran aground at Shellharbour on 15 May 1851.
 Bertha – Wrecked in a gale on 9 September 1879.
 Cities Service Boston – Went ashore at Bass Point on 16 May 1943.
 Comboyne – Wrecked off Bass Point on 27 November 1920.
 Echo – Wrecked near Long Point on 21 March 1863.
 Franz – Wrecked near Lake Illawarra on 9 September 1879.
 Our Own – Ran aground at Bass Point on 21 August 1880.

Facilities
Shellharbour is undergoing extensive development with the construction of many new retail outlets and home-units. The main street is Addison Street, with many footpath cafés and shops and the Roo Theatre Company, running through the town and ending with the Ocean Beach Hotel opposite the harbour. Adjacent to the harbour is the Beverley Whitfield saltwater swimming pool and across from the Shellharbour Beach facilities is the Beverley Whitfield park, containing the Tom "Scout" Willoughby cricket oval.

Demographics
According to the 2016 census of population, there were 3,561 people in Shellharbour.
 Aboriginal and Torres Strait Islander people made up 2.8% of the population. 
 75.9% of people were born in Australia. The next most common country of birth was England 4.9%.   
 85.2% of people only spoke English at home. 
 The most common responses for religion were Catholic 29.7%, No Religion 23.6% and Anglican 19.6%.

Notable people
Edward Allen - politician
James Bell - Australian rules footballer
Josh Bingham - soccer player
Trudy Burke - soccer player
Ron Costello - rugby league player
Adam Docker - rugby league player
Jai Field - Rugby League Player / Super League Player
John Daniel FitzGerald - politician
Caitlin Foord - soccer player
Jackson Ford - rugby league player
Madeline Heiner - runner
Beau Henry - rugby league player
Rikeya Horne - rugby league player
Michelle Heyman - soccer player
Kane Linnett - soccer player
Dan Palmer - rugby union player
Ellen Perez - tennis player
John Reid - politician
Casey Sablowski - hockey player
David Smith - canoeist
Alexander Volkanovski - UFC Champion
Adam Zampa - cricketer

References

External links
Shellharbour City Council website
Tourism Shellharbour website

City of Shellharbour
Suburbs of Wollongong
1817 establishments in Australia